Siu Hong is an MTR station located beside Siu Hong Court, Tuen Mun, New Territories. It is built on the Tuen Mun Nullah immediately east of Siu Hong Court. Elevated public transport interchanges are provided at both the south and north ends of the station. Two access ramps link the public transport interchanges to Castle Peak Road and Tsing Lun Road for access to feeder services such as buses, minibuses, and taxis.

History
Construction started in July 1999 with the award of civil contract CC-212 for the West Rail line station to HK ACE JV at a contract sum of HK$1,386 million. The topping-out was marked on 26 February 2002 by KCR chairman Michael Tien and transport legislator Miriam Lau. It was opened to the public on 20 December 2003 with the commencement of West Rail service.

The elevated station is located above the Tuen Mun Nullah. To support the station, 352 columns were built in the river bed, impacting the water flow. As a result, the river was widened by about 17 metres along the length of the station to maintain its drainage capacity.

Hence, Siu Hong was included in the project and is now an intermediate station on the Tuen Ma line.

Station layout

Platforms 1 and 2 share the same island platform.

The first train to Tuen Mun departs at 6:26 a.m., while the last train departs at 12:40 a.m. the day after. The first train to Hung Hom departs at 5:47 a.m., while the last train departs at 12:17 a.m. the day after.

Entrances/exits
 A: Brilliant Garden
 B1: Light Rail Platform 2
 B2: Light Rail Platform 2
 C1: Light Rail Platforms 1 and 5
 C2: Light Rail Platform 6
 C3: Light Rail Platforms 1 and 5 
 D: Lost Property & Travel Scheme Office 
 E: San Hing Tsuen
 F: Lingnan University

References

MTR stations in the New Territories
West Rail line
Tuen Ma line
Former Kowloon–Canton Railway stations
Tuen Mun District
Railway stations in Hong Kong opened in 2003
2003 establishments in Hong Kong